South Brisbane Football Club was an Australian rules club which competed in the Queensland Football League. They joined the league in 1910 and played in it until 1940 with the exception of the 1925 season which they sat out. Notable players include Brian O'Connor, Harry Pegg and Donald Watt.

Honours

Premierships (4)
 1910
 1911
 1914
 1921

External links
Fullpointsfooty

South
Australian rules football clubs in Brisbane
Australian rules football clubs established in 1910
South Brisbane, Queensland
1910 establishments in Australia
1940 disestablishments in Australia
Australian rules football clubs disestablished in 1940